Scrubs: Interns is an American webisode series from ABC based on the comedy-drama series Scrubs in its eighth season, which originally aired on ABC.com; each episode would premiere the day a new Scrubs episode aired on TV. The webisodes originally premiered between January 1, 2009 and April 8, 2009, with two additional episodes being released on the season eight DVD and Blu-ray set.

The webisodes featured four interns in their first year at Sacred Heart Hospital – Katie Collins (Betsy Beutler), Denise "Jo" Mahoney (Eliza Coupe), Howie Gelder (Todd Bosley) and Sonja "Sunny" Dey (Sonal Shah), who "directs" the series as a video diary project. Ed Dhandapani (Aziz Ansari) is mentioned in passing but only appears in the final webisode.

Each of the main cast members of Scrubs appears in at least one webisode. Two recurring cast members, Ted and The Todd, also make appearances.

Some of the episodes relate directly to the main series. For example, "Screw You with Ted and the Gooch" consists largely of an unabridged scene from "My Lawyer's in Love."

Cast
 Sonal Shah as Sonia "Sunny" Dey (12 episodes)
 Eliza Coupe as Denise "Jo" Mahoney (9)
 Betsy Beutler as Katie Collins (8)
 Todd Bosley as Howie Gelder (8)
 Sam Lloyd as Ted Buckland (6)
 Neil Flynn as The Janitor (4)
 Robert Maschio as Dr. Todd Quinlan (4)
 John C. McGinley as Dr. Perry Cox (1)
 Zach Braff as Dr. John "J.D." Dorian (1)
 Sarah Chalke as Dr. Elliot Reid (1)
 Donald Faison as Dr. Chris Turk (1)
 Judy Reyes as Nurse Carla Espinosa (1)
 Ken Jenkins as Dr. Bob Kelso (1)
 Taran Killam as Jimmy the Overly Touchy Orderly (1)
 Kate Micucci as Stephanie Gooch (1)
 Aziz Ansari as Ed Dhandapani (1)
 Philip McNiven as Roy (1)
 George Miserlis as Crispin (1)
 Paul Perry as Randall (1)
 Devin Mahoney as Chubby guy (1)
 Eren Celeboglu as Patient (1)

Theme song
The theme song of Scrubs: Interns is "Don't Tell Me" by The Blanks (known as Ted's Band or The Worthless Peons on Scrubs).

Webisodes

References

External links 
 

2009 web series debuts
2009 web series endings
Scrubs (TV series)
American comedy web series
ABC.com original programming